FL Lady Bug (1945–1974) was a Quarter Horse mare who was never raced or was shown in a horse show, yet was made famous for her speedy offspring.

Life

FL Lady Bug was registered as number 9733 in the American Quarter Horse Association's (or AQHA) stud book. A sorrel mare, she was foaled in 1945 and bred by W. A. Yeager of Woodward, Oklahoma. Her owners at the time she was registered were Bill and Alive Likins of Davis, Oklahoma. Her sire, Sergeant, was bred to a daughter of his full brother, Will Stead, to produce Lady Bug. Thus, FL Lady Bug was inbred to both Billy McCue and Silver. Her second dam was an unnamed quarter mare from the J A Ranch in Texas.

Breeding record 
FL Lady Bug had fourteen foals, eleven of whom started races. Ten of those starters were winners, with one Champion Quarter Running Two Year Old Filly – Top Ladybug, three stakes winners, and ten Race Register of Merit winners. All ten of her Register of Merit qualifiers were sired by different stallions.

Death and honors 
She died on March 1, 1974.

FL Lady Bug was inducted into the AQHA Hall of Fame in 1999.

Pedigree

Notes

References

 All Breed Pedigree Database Pedigree of FL Lady Bug retrieved on July 4, 2007

External links
 FL Lady Bug at Quarter Horse Directory
 FL Lady Bug at Quarter Horse Legends

American Quarter Horse broodmares
1945 animal births
1974 animal deaths
AQHA Hall of Fame (horses)